The National Order of Mali is the highest of honorific orders of Mali.

History 
The National Order of Mali was founded on 31 May 1963 to celebrate the independence of the country acquired in 1960 after decades of French colonisation.
As such, the order was granted to deserving personalities to the state and could also be granted to foreign heads of state as a sign of friendship.

Classes 
The Order consists of the following classes of merit:

Recipients 
 Recep Tayyip Erdoğan, President of Turkey
 Kim Il-sung, President of North Korea
 Kim Song-ae, wife of Kim Il-sung
 Kim Jong-il, heir apparent of Kim Il-sung

Insignia 
The medal of the Order is composed on the model of French Legion of Honor with a ten-pointed yellow outer cross, each point ending in a gold pearl and a ten-pointed smaller inner red cross, edged in gold. At the center of the crosses is a medallion of red enamel with the letters "RM" ("République du Mali"), surrounded by a golden ring, bearing the phrase "ORDRE NATIONAL" ("National Order") in red letters above and two crossed laurel branches under.

The plaque  has the same design as the medal, on an eight-pointed "silver rays" star.

The ribbon is yellow with a green border on one side and a red one on the other, which remember the colours of the national flag of Mali.

References

 
Orders, decorations, and medals of Mali
Mali, National Order of
Awards established in 1963
1963 establishments in Africa